Héctor Socorro Varela (26 June 1912 – 1980) was a Cuban footballer.

International career
He represented Cuba at the 1938 World Cup in France, scoring three goals in the two matches against Romania.

References

External links
 

1912 births
1980 deaths
Association football forwards
Cuban footballers
Cuba international footballers
1938 FIFA World Cup players